Gregbrownia brownii, synonym Mezobromelia brownii, is a species of flowering plant in the family Bromeliaceae. It is endemic to Ecuador. Its natural habitats are subtropical or tropical moist montane forests and subtropical or tropical high-altitude shrubland. It is threatened by habitat loss.

References

Flora of Ecuador
Tillandsioideae
Vulnerable plants
Taxonomy articles created by Polbot